The 1988–89 North West Counties Football League was the seventh in the history of the North West Counties Football League, a football competition in England. Teams were divided into two divisions.

Division One

Kirkby Town changed their name to Knowsley United

Division One featured 2 new teams:

 Ashton United promoted as champions from Division Two
 Flixton promoted as runners-up from Division Two

League table

Division Two

Division Two featured 1 new team:

 Glossop, relegated from Division One

League table

Promotion and relegation

Division One
Rossendale United were promoted to the Northern Premier League while Formby were relegated to the Second Division. Ellesmere Port & Neston left the League at the end of the season.

Division two
Vauxhall Motors, Chadderton and Nantwich Town were promoted to Division One. Daisy Hill changed their name to Westhoughton Town.

External links 
 North West Counties Football League Tables at RSSSF

North West Counties Football League seasons
8